Sidney Edmond Jocelyn Ackland CBE (born 29 February 1928) is an English retired actor who has appeared in more than 130 film and television roles. He was nominated for the BAFTA Award for Best Actor in a Supporting Role for portraying Jock Delves Broughton in White Mischief (1987).

Early life
Ackland was born in North Kensington, London on 29 February 1928, the son of Major Sydney Norman Ackland (died 1981), an Irish journalist who had been sent to England to live with an aunt by his parents for seducing their maid, but subsequently seduced his aunt's maid, Ruth Izod (died 1957), whom he married. He was trained by Elsie Fogerty at the Central School of Speech and Drama, then based at the Royal Albert Hall, London.

Ackland and Rosemary Kirkcaldy were married on 18 August 1951, when Ackland was 23 and she 22. She was an actress and Ackland wooed her when they appeared on stage together in Pitlochry, Scotland. The couple struggled initially as Ackland's acting career was in its infancy. They moved to Lilongwe, Malawi, where Ackland managed a tea plantation for six months but, deciding it was too dangerous, they moved to Cape Town, South Africa. Though they both obtained steady acting jobs in South Africa, after two years they returned to England in 1957.

Career
Ackland joined the Old Vic, appearing alongside other notable actors including Maggie Smith, Judi Dench and Tom Courtenay. Ackland worked steadily in television and film in the 1960s and 70s. He worked opposite Alec Guinness in the 1979 television serial Tinker Tailor Soldier Spy, playing sporting journalist and intermittent British espionage operative Jerry Westerby, and his career advanced through the 1980s with important parts in such films as The Sicilian, Lethal Weapon 2, The Hunt for Red October and White Mischief.

On television Ackland appeared as Jephro Rucastle with Jeremy Brett and David Burke in The Adventures of Sherlock Holmes; the episode entitled "The Copper Beeches". Other appearances included Passion of Mind with Demi Moore and the two-part TV serial Hogfather based on Terry Pratchett's Discworld. He played C. S. Lewis in the television version of Shadowlands before it was adapted into a stage play starring Nigel Hawthorne and then a theatrical film with Anthony Hopkins in the same role.

His stage roles included creating the role of Juan Perón in Tim Rice and Andrew Lloyd Webber's musical Evita opposite Elaine Paige.  He also starred in the London production of Stephen Sondheim's and Hugh Wheeler's A Little Night Music with Jean Simmons and Hermione Gingold, performing on the RCA Victor original London cast album.

Ackland appears in the Pet Shop Boys' 1987 film It Couldn't Happen Here, and in the video for their version of the song Always on My Mind, which was taken from the film. Several years later, he said in an interview with the Radio Times that he appeared with the band purely because his grandchildren liked their music.

He also co-starred as Emilio Estevez's mentor and friend Hans in the 1992 Disney hit The Mighty Ducks. He reprised the role four years later in 1996's D3: The Mighty Ducks.

In a 2001 interview with the BBC, Ackland said that he appeared in some "awful films" due to being a workaholic. He said that he "regretted" appearing in Bill & Ted's Bogus Journey and the Pet Shop Boys music video. He also criticised former co-star Demi Moore as "not very bright or talented".

Also in 2007, Ackland appeared in the film How About You opposite Vanessa Redgrave, portraying a recovering alcoholic living in a residential home after being forced to retire and losing his wife to cancer.

In 2008, he returned to the small screen as Sir Freddy Butler, a much married baronet, in the ITV1 show Midsomer Murders. The episode, entitled Vixens Run also featured veteran actress Siân Phillips.

In September 2013, Jonathan Miller directed a Gala Performance of William Shakespeare's King Lear at the Old Vic in London. Ackland played Lear.

Personal life
Ackland and his wife Rosemary were married for 51 years. They had seven children, thirty-two grandchildren and eight great-grandchildren. Despite his filming taking him to far-flung locations, he said Rosemary and he "were hardly ever apart". Daughter Kirsty married Anthony Shawn Baring, a descendant of the merchant banker Sir Francis Baring, 1st Baronet and a descendant of Robert Rundell Guinness, founder of the merchant bank Guinness Mahon. In 1963, their house in Barnes caught fire. Rosemary saved their five children but broke her back when jumping from the bedroom window. She was told she would miscarry and never walk again, but later gave birth and, after 18 months in Stoke Mandeville Hospital, walked again. Their eldest son, Paul, died of a heroin overdose in 1982, aged 29. In 2000, Rosemary was diagnosed with motor neurone disease; she died on 25 July 2002. In 2020, Ackland participated in the Letters Live project, and was recorded from his home in Clovelly, Devon. His letter reflected on the COVID-19 crisis and his hopes for how the country could draw 'strength from adversity'.

Filmography

 Landfall (1949) (uncredited) as O'Neill
 Seven Days to Noon (1950)
 Ghost Ship (1952) as Ron, a seaman
 Destination Downing Street (1957) (TV) as Immelmann
 A Midsummer Night's Dream (1959)
 In Search of the Castaways (1962) (uncredited) as Seaman on yacht
 The Indian Tales of Rudyard Kipling (1963) (TV) as William Stevens
 David Copperfield (1966) (TV serial) as Mr. Peggotty
 Rasputin: the Mad Monk (1966) as the Bishop
 Lord Raingo (1966) (TV) as Tom Hogarth
 On the March to the Sea (1966) (TV)
 Room 13 (1966) (TV) as Herr Scavenius
 The Further Adventures of the Three Musketeers (1967) (TV series) as d'Artagnan
 The Troubleshooters (1966) (TV) (1966–1968) as Mr Gibbon (1966), Sam Jardine (1966–1967), Considine (1968), Lewis (1968)
 Mystery and Imagination (1966) (TV) (1966, 1968) as Herr Scavenius
 A Place of One's Own (1968) (TV)
 Z-Cars (1967) (TV) (1967–1968) as Det. Insp. Todd
 The Avengers (1969) (TV series) as Brig. Hansing
 The Gold Robbers (1969) (TV) as Derek Hartford
 Before the Party (1969) (TV) as Harold Bannon
 Crescendo (1969) as Carter
 The House That Dripped Blood (1970) as Neville Rogers
 The Three Sisters (1970) (BBC Play of the Month series) as Chebutykin
 Mr. Forbush and the Penguins (1972) as The Leader
 Thirty-Minute Theatre (1971) (TV) (1971, 1972)
 Villain (1971) as Edgar Lewis
 The Persuaders! (1972) (TV) as Felix Meadowes
 Shirley's World (1972) (TV) as Inspector Vaughan
 The Happiness Cage (1972) as Dr Frederick
 Six Faces (1972) (TV series) as Harry Mellor
 Six Faces: True Life (1972) (TV)
 Six Faces: Gallery of Faces (1972) (TV)
 Penny Gold (1973)
 The Rivals of Sherlock Holmes (1973) (TV) as Grubber
 Hitler: The Last Ten Days (1973) (TV) as Gen. Burgdorf
 England Made Me (1973) as Haller
 The Three Musketeers (1973) as D'Artagnan's Father
 The Protectors (1974) (TV) as Arthur Gordon
 The Black Windmill (1974) as Chief Supt. Wray
 S*P*Y*S (1974) ... Martinson
 The Little Prince (1974) as the King
 Great Expectations (1974) (TV) as Joe Gargery
 One of Our Dinosaurs Is Missing (1975) as B.J. Spence
 Royal Flash (1975) as Sapten
 Operation Daybreak (1975) as Janák
 You Talk Too Much (1976) (TV)
 The Crezz (1976) (TV series) as Charles Bronte
 The Strange Case of the End of Civilization as We Know It (1977) as President
 Watership Down (1978) (voice) as Black Rabbit
 Enemy at the Door (1978) (TV) as Major General Laidlaw
 Silver Bears (1978) as Henry Foreman
 The Greek Tycoon (1978) (uncredited)
 Who Is Killing the Great Chefs of Europe? (1978) as Cantrell
 Return of the Saint (1978) (TV) as Gunther
 The Sweeney (1978) (TV) as Alan Ember
 A Nightingale Sang in Berkeley Square (1979) (uncredited) as Prison Warden
 Saint Jack (1979) as Yardley
 Tinker Tailor Soldier Spy (TV) (1979) as Jerry Westerby
 Tales of the Unexpected (1980) (TV) (1980, 1988) as Malcolm Harper (1980), Colonel George Peregrine (1988)
 A Question of Guilt (1980) (TV series) as Samuel Kent
 The Love Tapes (1980) (TV) (uncredited) as Narrator
 Rough Cut (1980) as Insp. Vanderveld
 The Gentle Touch (TV) as Ivor Stocker
 The Apple (1980) as Hippie Leader/Mr Topps
 Dangerous Davies – The Last Detective (1981) as Chief Insp. Yardbird
 Thicker Than Water (1981) (TV) as Joseph Lockwood
 The Confessions of Felix Krull (1982) (TV series) as Mr. Twentyman
 The Barretts of Wimpole Street (1982) (TV) as Edward Moulton-Barrett
 Shroud for a Nightingale (1984) (TV) as Stephen Courtney-Briggs, surgeon
 The Tragedy of Coriolanus (1984) (TV) as Menenius
 Shadowlands (1985) (TV) as C. S. Lewis
 A Zed & Two Noughts (1985) as Van Hoyten
 The Adventures of Sherlock Holmes – "The Copper Beeches" (1985) (TV series) as Jephro Rucastle
 Lady Jane (1986) as Sir John Bridges
 When We Are Married (1987) (TV) as Henry Ormonroyd
 White Mischief (1987) as Sir Jock Delves Broughton
 A Killing on the Exchange (1987) (TV) as Sir Max Sillman
 Queenie (1987) (TV) as Sir Burton Rumsey
 The Sicilian (1987) as Don Masino Croce
 It Couldn't Happen Here (1988) as Priest/murderer
 The Man Who Lived at the Ritz (1988) (TV) as Hermann Göring
 Codename: Kyril (1988) (TV) as 'C'
 To Kill a Priest (1988) as Colonel
 First and Last (1989) (TV) as Alan Holly
 A Quiet Conspiracy (1989) (TV) as Theo Carter
 The Justice Game (1989) (TV) as Sir James Crichton
 Lethal Weapon 2 (1989) as Arjen 'Aryan' Rudd
 Jekyll & Hyde (1990) (TV) as Charles Lanyon
 Dimenticare Palermo (1990) (TV) as Mafia boss
 The Hunt for Red October (1990) as Ambassador Andrei Lysenko
 The Secret Life of Ian Fleming (1990) (TV) as Gen. Gerhard Hellstein
 Tre colonne in cronaca (1990) as Gaetano Leporino
 Incident at Victoria Falls (1991) (TV) as King Edward
 A Murder of Quality (1991) (TV) as Terence Fielding
 The Object of Beauty (1991) as Mr Mercer
 Bill & Ted's Bogus Journey (1991) as Chuck De Nomolos
 A Woman Named Jackie (1991) (TV) as Aristotle Onassis
 Ashenden (1991) (TV) as Cumming
 They Do It with Mirrors (1991) (TV) as Lewis Serrocold
 The Sheltering Desert (1992) as Col. Johnston
 Once Upon a Crime (1992) as Hercules Popodopoulos
 Shadowchaser (1992) as Kinderman
 The Bridge (1992) as Smithson
 The Mighty Ducks (1992) as Hans
 The Young Indiana Jones Chronicles - episode - "Austria, March 1917" - The Prussian (1992)
 Shakespeare: The Animated Tales (1992) (TV) (voice) as Julius Caesar
 Nowhere to Run (1993) as Franklin Hale
 Voices in the Garden (1993) (TV) as Sir Charles (Archie) Peverall
 The Princess and the Goblin (1993) (voice) as King Papa
 OcchioPinocchio (1994) as Brando
 Miracle on 34th Street -  Victor Landberg (Store Competitor for Shopper's Express) (uncredited) (1994)
 Jacob (1994) (TV) as Isaac
 Citizen Locke (1994) (TV) as Lord Ashley
 Giorgino (1994) as Father Glaise
 Citizen X (1995) (TV) as Bondarchuk
 Mad Dogs and Englishmen (1995) as Insp. Sam Stringer
 The Thief and the Cobbler (1995) (voice) as Brigands
 A Kid in King Arthur's Court (1995) as King Arthur
 Daisies in December (1995) (TV) as Gerald Carmody
 Testament: The Bible in Animation (1996) (TV) (voice) as Noah
 Hidden in Silence (1996) (TV) as German factory manager
 Deadly Voyage (1996) (TV) as Captain
 To the Ends of Time (1996) (TV) as King Francis
 Surviving Picasso (1996) as Henri Matisse
 D3: The Mighty Ducks (1996) as Hans
 Swept from the Sea (1997) as Mr Swaffer
 Heat of the Sun (1998) (TV) as Max van der Vuurst
 My Giant (1998) (uncredited) as Monsignor Popescu
 The Mumbo Jumbo (2000) as Mayor Smith
 Passion of Mind (2000) as Dr Langer, the French Psychiatrist
 Othello (2001) (TV) as James Brabant
 No Good Deed (2002) as Mr Thomas Quarre
 K-19: The Widowmaker (2002) as Marshal Zelentsov
 Tomb Raider: The Angel of Darkness (2003) (voice) as Pieter Van Eckhardt
 Henry VIII (2003) (TV) as Henry VII
 I'll Be There (2003) as Evil Edmonds
 A Different Loyalty (2004) as Randolph Cauffield
 The Christmas Eve Snowfall (2005) (Narrator)
 Asylum (2005) as Jack Straffen
 Icon (2005) (TV) as retired General Nikolai Nikolayev
 Midsomer Murders (2006) Vixen's Run.(TVs) as Sir Freddy Butler
 These Foolish Things (2006) as Albert
 Moscow Zero (2006) as Tolstoy
 Above and Beyond (2006) (TV) as Winston Churchill
 Hogfather (2006) (TV) as Mustrum Ridcully
 Rise of the Ogre (Audiobook) (2006) (Narrator)
 How About You (2007) as Donald
 Kingdom (2007) as Mr Narbutowicz
 Flawless (2008) as MKA
 Prisoners of the Sun (2013) as Prof. Mendella
 Katherine of Alexandria (2014) as Rufus

Bibliography
 Ackland, Joss (17 June 2010). My Better Half and Me. Ebury Press. 
 -- (1989). I Must Be In There Somewhere (autobiography). Hodder and Stoughton.

References

External links

 
 

1928 births
Living people
20th-century English male actors
21st-century English male actors
Alumni of the Royal Central School of Speech and Drama
Commanders of the Order of the British Empire
English male film actors
English male stage actors
English male television actors
English male voice actors
Male actors from London
People from Kensington
Royal Shakespeare Company members